Celebration of Life is a one-hour English play written and directed by Sachin Gupta.

Characters 
Vanessa, Whitney, Brandon, Sophia, Julia, Michael.

Off-Broadway cast 
Vanessa: Claire Duncan  
Whitney: Clara Campi  
Brandon: Erick Gonzales  
Sophia: Krystina Bisante  
Julia: Sima Stuve  
Michael: Rocco D'Elia.

Past seasons 
2008–2009
 At the Soho Playhouse

2007–2008
 At the Sriram Centre Auditorium

2006–2007
 At Factory Theatre Canada
 At Sriram Centre Auditorium India

2005–2006
 At the LTG Auditorium

2003–2004
 At the Sriram Centre Auditorium

References 
 The Hindu
"Out of the Box", The Tribune
 "Sachin Gupta makes the stage come alive" The Indian Express
 "A Man with A Dream" The Hindu
  The Hindu
 "Life On Stage" The Hindu
 "Celebration of Life a moving play" The Tribune

External links 
  Chilsag Chillies,Home Page

Indian plays
2003 plays